IWE may refer to:

 International Worship in English, a Christian ministry of American missionary to South Korea, Bill Majors
 International Wrestling Enterprise, a Japanese professional wrestling promotion active from 1966 to 1981
 Integrated writing environment
 "IWE", a single by Noisettes from the album What's the Time Mr Wolf?
 International Welding Engineer